Inscape (stylized as iNSCAPE), was a short-lived video game publisher in the mid-1990s.  Michael L. Nash founded the company, which was jointly funded by two Time Warner subsidiaries, Home Box Office and Warner Music Group, with $5 million in startup money.  The company was a blend of talent from the entertainment and programming industries.

History
Michael L. Nash executive produced Freak Show (published by Voyager in 1993) in cooperation with San Francisco-based art collective The Residents, calling it "a cross between 'Sim City' and 'Twin Peaks.'"  After Nash founded Inscape in 1994, the group worked with him again to create Inscape's first game in 1995, Bad Day on the Midway, a game CD-ROM Today called "One of the Top Ten Discs of All Time".  Bad Day on the Midway was something of a sequel to Freak Show, with both games taking place at traveling carnival.

Inscape's next game, The Dark Eye, was released in 1995.  At the Electronic Entertainment Expo in May 1996, the company was set to release a new slate of upcoming games: The Egyptian Jukebox; first-person shooter Assassin 2015; conspiracy-themed adventure game Drowned God; 3-D action game Squeezils; and Ravage, a science fiction action adventure game.  The company also planned to show two previously announced games, adventure game Devo Presents: Adventures of the Smart Patrol and Where's Waldo?: Exploring Geography.

In February 1997, it was announced that Inscape would be acquired by and become a division of Graphix Zone, after which Inscape was known as Ignite. While four other company executives, vice presidents Rob Sebastian, David Boss, Brock LaPorte and project director Rebekah Behrendt moved with the merger, Nash went his own way.  In a June 1997 interview about multimedia and his company, Nash said:

Graphix Zone itself ceased operations in November 1997.

References

Video game publishers
Video game companies established in 1994
Video game companies disestablished in 1997
Defunct video game companies of the United States
Video game development companies
Companies based in Los Angeles
1994 establishments in California